Junia, called Junia Secunda by modern historians to distinguish her from her sisters, was an ancient Roman woman who lived in the 1st century BC. She was married to the triumvir Marcus Aemilius Lepidus.

Biography

Early life

Junia Secunda was daughter of Servilia (who was the half-sister of Cato the Younger and mistress of Julius Caesar) and Decimus Junius Silanus. She was the half-sister of Marcus Junius Brutus through her mother and full sister of Marcus Junius Silanus, Junia Prima and Junia Tertia.

Marriage
She married Lepidus, who later became a member of the Second Triumvirate, alongside Mark Antony and Octavian (later Augustus). Unlike his fellow triumvirs, Lepidus remained married to the same woman throughout his life, and seems to have been devoted to Junia.

In his speeches, Cicero praised Junia as the ideal wife. In a private letter to Atticus, however, Cicero claimed that Junia was unfaithful to Lepidus, on the grounds that her portrait was seen among the chattels of a debauchee called Publius Vedius (possibly Publius Vedius Pollio), and expresses surprise that her husband and brother took no notice of her conduct. However some have argued that it was Junia Prima, rather than Junia Secunda, who had the affair with Vedius.

Plot against Octavian
After her husband was forced from power by Octavian, Junia lost much of her status. After the battle of Actium she became part of a plot to kill Octavian, formed by her son Lepidus the Younger. However it was foiled by Gaius Maecenas. Her son was executed after being sent to Octavian, who was still in the east at the time. She was summoned to follow him to appear before Octavian. Her husband had to plead with his former enemy Lucius Saenius Balbinus to grant her bail so that she could remain with him until Octavian returned.

Family

References

1st-century BC Roman women
1st-century BC Romans
Children of Servilia (mother of Brutus)
Family of Marcus Junius Brutus
Secunda